Vice-Admiral William Stanhope Lovell, KH (1788–1859) was a vice-admiral in the British Royal Navy and a descendant of Sir Salathiel Lovell.
 
He was born William Stanhope Badcock, the eldest son of Thomas Stanhope Badcock of Little Missenden Abbey, Buckinghamshire and Maplethorpe Hall, Lincolnshire.

He served under Lord Nelson at Trafalgar in 1805 and was present at the capture of Washington in 1814.

He was married, in 1822, to Selina, daughter of Sir Henry Harpur Crewe of Calke Abbey, Derbyshire.

He and his elder brother, Lovell Benjamin Badcock, changed their name of Badcock to Lovell by sign-manual in 1840.

References

External links 
 

Royal Navy vice admirals
1788 births
1859 deaths
Royal Navy personnel of the Napoleonic Wars
Royal Navy personnel of the War of 1812